The Chair of Los Angeles County, formally the Chair of the Los Angeles County Board of Supervisors, and sometimes known as the Mayor of Los Angeles County, is responsible for the day-to-day operations of the county government. They are members of, and serve as presiding officer for, the Los Angeles County Board of Supervisors.  The board members serve as chair for one year each on a rotating basis.

History
The Chair of the Board of Supervisors serves a term of one year. Upon expiration of the term the duties of the Chair are rotated among the board members by order of seniority. Because the term for a supervisor typically lasts four years, any member will get to serve as chair at least once during the duration of their term. The chair may be stylized as "mayor", a practice that was started and only observed by Michael D. Antonovich during his tenure as a supervisor. This tradition was not continued by the current incumbents.

Chairs/Mayor 
These are the lists of Chair/Mayors of Los Angeles County

Governance 

The Mayor/Chair shall possess the powers and perform the duties prescribed, as follows:

a. Have general direction over the Board Room and assign seats for the use of the members;

b. Preserve order and decorum; prevent demonstrations; order removed from the Board Room any person whose conduct deemed objectionable; and order the Board Room cleared whenever deemed necessary (Government Code Section 54957.9, see Appendix);

c. Assure that attendants of the public at meetings in the Board Room shall be limited to that number which can be accommodated by the seating facilities regularly maintained therein. No standees shall be permitted;

d. Allocate the length of time for public discussion of any matter in advance of such discussion, with the concurrence of the Board;

e. Allocate equal time to opposing sides insofar as possible taking into account the number of persons requesting to be heard on any side;

f. Limit the amount of time that a person may address the Board during a public discussion period in order to accommodate those persons desiring to speak and to facilitate the business of the Board;

g. Authorize not more than one Set Matter per Board meeting. Any additional Set Matters shall require Board action; and

h. Instruct a member of the public who wishes to address the Board on a matter under the supervision of the Department of Children and Family Services that such matter is not within the subject matter jurisdiction of the Board, that it is not within the power of the Board to alter the outcome of a court matter, and that case identifying information is confidential and may not be disclosed in public; bar public disclosure of such information; and direct the person to Section 38 which outlines the alternate procedure to be followed.

Elected 
At noon on the first Monday in December, in the even-numbered years, the Chair Pro Tem shall automatically succeed to the position of Chair to serve until the election or succession of his/her successor; in the event there is no Chair Pro Tem, the Board shall elect a Mayor/Chair to serve for the said period. If the term of the Mayor/Chair expires in an odd-numbered year, the succession or election as provided herein of the new Mayor/Chair shall take place at 9:30 a.m. the first Tuesday following the first Monday in December. Upon the succession of the Chair Pro Tem to the position of Mayor/Chair.

References

External links
Official website

Los Angeles County Board of Supervisors
Chairpersons of organizations
Government of Los Angeles County, California
Los Angeles-related lists
History of Los Angeles County, California